The Willow Tank Formation is a geologic formation which outcrops in the U.S. state of Nevada. Initially believed to be of Early Cretaceous (Albian) age, later studies have concluded that it was more likely to be of Late Cretaceous (Cenomanian) age, making it equivalent to the Cloverly and Cedar Mountain Formations. It was deposited in an anastomosed fluvial system.

Paleofauna 
All paleofauna listed are taken from a list compiled by Bonde (2008a) unless stated otherwise.

Non-dinosaurs 

 cf. Adocus
 Baena sp.
 Ceratodus sp.
 Coprolites (indet.)
 Crocodyliformes indet.
 Gastropoda indet.
 Holostei indet.
 Lepisosteidae indet.
 Naomichelys sp.
 Scoyenia sp.
 Trionychidae (?) indet.

 Dinosaurs 

 Dromaeosauridae indet.
 Iguanodontia indet.
 Macroelongatoolithus carlylei Nevadadromeus schmitti''
 Ornithopoda indet.
 Theropoda indet.
 Titanosauriformes indet.
 Thyreophora indet.
 Tyrannosauroidea indet.

References 

Geologic formations of Nevada